The  is a railway line in Japan operated by East Japan Railway Company (JR East). It connects Kōriyama Station in Kōriyama, Fukushima Prefecture, and Niitsu Station in Akiha Ward, Niigata, Niigata Prefecture.

Station list
 Local trains generally stop at all stations, but some trains skip stations marked "▽".
 The column marked "*" refers to the unnamed rapid service between Kōriyama and Aizu-Wakamatsu/Kitakata using 719 series EMUs.
 Trains can pass one another at stations marked "◇", "∨", or "∧"; stations marked "◆" are switchback stations. Trains cannot pass at stations marked "｜".

Rolling stock
, the following rolling stock is used on the Banetsu West Line.

Kōriyama—Kitakata
 719 series EMUs (since June 2007)
 E721-0 series EMUs (since 4 March 2017)

From 25 April 2015, a two-car 719 series set entered service on  services on the line between Koriyama and Aizu-Wakamatsu. The train accommodates 36 passengers.

Aizu-Wakamatsu—Niitsu
 KiHa 110 series DMUs
 GV-E400 series DEMUs (since August 2019)

Past
 455 series EMUs (from 1967 until March 2008)
 485 series EMUs (Aizu Liner rapid services)
 KiHa 40/47/48 DMUs (until March 2020)
 KiHa 52 DMUs (until 2009)
 KiHa 58 DMUs (until 2009)
 KiHa E120 DMUs (until March 2020)

History

The private Ganetsu Railway opened the initial section from Kōriyama to Nakayamajuku on July 26, 1898, and extended the line to Aizu-Wakamatsu the following year.

Japanese National Railways (JNR) started to modernize the line in the 1960s, introducing the line's first limited express service (as a part of the Yamagata-bound Yamabata) in 1965 between Ueno Station in Tokyo and Aizu-Wakamatsu via the Tōhoku Main Line. In 1968 the train was renamed Aizu Yamabata, but from 1993 onward it was renamed Viva Aizu and ran only between Koriyama and Aizu-Wakamatsu. The train was finally discontinued as a limited express service in 2003.

In 1967, JNR electrified the section between Kōriyama and Kitakata at 20 kV AC.

In 2011 the line was closed for 15 days in March following the Tohoku earthquake, two days in April as a result of aftershocks, and for 10 weeks following torrential rain at the end of July.

A new station, called , opened on 1 April 2017 between and Kōriyama and Kikuta stations.

The railway bridge connecting Kitakata and Yamato collapsed due to heavy rain on 4 August 2022. All services are suspended between Kitakata and Nozawa.

See also
 Aizu Liner
 Banetsu Monogatari

References

External links

FruiTea Fukushima - JR East
SL Banetsu Monogatari - JR East

 
1067 mm gauge railways in Japan
Lines of East Japan Railway Company
Rail transport in Fukushima Prefecture
Rail transport in Niigata Prefecture
Railway lines opened in 1898